Salto Postale is a German sitcom television series.

See also
List of German television series

External links
 

1993 German television series debuts
1996 German television series endings
German-language television shows
German comedy television series
ZDF original programming